The Golden Calf is the award of the Netherlands Film Festival, which is held annually in Utrecht. The award has been presented since 1981, originally in six categories: Best Actor, Best Actress, Best Feature Film, Best Short Film, Culture Prize and Honourable mention. In 2004, there were 16 award categories, mainly because in 2003 the categories Best Photography, Best Montage, Best Music, Best Production Design, Best Sound Design were added.

Famous Dutch film makers and actors that have won a Golden Calf include Rutger Hauer, Louis van Gasteren, Paul Verhoeven, Eddy Terstall, Carice van Houten, Felix de Rooy, Fons Rademakers, Martin Koolhoven, Alex van Warmerdam, Fedja van Huêt, Jean van de Velde, Pim de la Parra, Dick Maas, Marleen Gorris, Ian Kerkhof, Jeroen Krabbé, Monic Hendrickx, Rijk de Gooyer and Marwan Kenzari.

Name and meaning
The name refers to an animal as is common in names of European film awards, such as the Golden Bear of the Berlin Film Festival and the Golden Lion of the Venice Film Festival, and cattle is one of the most common types of livestock in the Netherlands.  The name of the award also refers to the Bible reference, where a golden statue of a calf was made by Aaron, which was later destroyed by Moses because God prohibits worshipping anything other than the One, True God. Jury member in 2002 Martin Koolhoven says the Dutch Calvinist culture is more relativizing than proud: "This is why the Golden Calf is such a good prize, because of the wink that is included. Other countries have golden lions and golden bears. We have a golden calf and after all it is sinful to worship it."

In 1995 Rijk de Gooyer threw his Golden Calf statuette on the street in the reality TV series Taxi (the Dutch version of Taxicab Confessions), when he was picked up by a taxi after a dissatisfying closing ceremony at the Netherlands Film Festival.  In 1999 he let Maarten Spanjer, the host of Taxi, throw his Golden Calf for Scratches in the Table out of the window.

Award categories

Film awards
 Culture Prize
 Best long feature film
 Best Director
 Best Script
 Best Leading Role
 Best Supporting Role
 Best Short film
 Best long documentary
 Best Short Documentary
 Best Cinematography
 Best Editing
 Best Music
 Best Production Design
 Best Sound Design
 Best Photography

TV awards
 Best Actor in a Television Drama
 Best Actress in a Television Drama
 Best Acting in a Television Drama
 Best Television Drama

Interactive award
The Golden Calf Award for Best Interactive is a category presented since 2015. It is awarded to forms of interactive storytelling outside standard film and television like, for instance, VR films, video games, website design, webseries and social media projects.

The winners were:
 2015: Refugee Republic - De Volkskrant/Submarinechannel
 2016: The Modular Body - Floris Kaayk
 2017: Horizon Zero Dawn - Guerrilla Games
 2018: #DEARCATCALLERS - Noa Jansma
 2019: Die Fernweh Oper - Daniel Ernst/The Shoebox Diorama
 2020: Nerd Funk -  Ali Eslami and Mamali Shafahi
 2021: IVF-X: Posthuman Parenting in Hybrid Reality - Victorine van Alphen
 2022: LAWKI (Life As We Know It) - ARK

Special awards
 Special Jury Prize
 Public Prize
 Development Prize
 Awards only awarded once or twice are:
 Best Film of the Century (1999) - Paul Verhoeven & Rob Houwer for Turks Fruit
 Control Award (1994, 1992) - Cor Koppies (1994), J.Th. van Taalingen (1992)
 Best Commercial (1990, 1991) - Todd Masters for Woonruimte gevraagd (1991), Trevor Wrenn voor Hamka's (1990)
 Best European Film (1994, 1995) - Kazimierz Kutz for Turned Back (1995), Jonathan Cavendisch & Tim Palmer for Into the West (1994)

Retired awards
 Occupation Award
 Honourable Mention

References

External links
 
 Netherlands Film Festival at the Internet Movie Database

Dutch film awards
 
Awards established in 1981
Golden calf